Stefanovikeio railway station is a railway station in Stefanovikeio, Thessaly, Greece. It is located outside the settlement, close to a level crossing. Opened on 22 April 1884 by the Thessaly Railways (now part of OSE). Today TrainOSE operates fourteen daily local trains to Larissa and Volos.

History
The station was opened on 22 April 1884 by the Thessaly Railways (now part of OSE). The line was designed by the Italian Evaristo de Chirico, (father of Giorgio de Chirico) soon after the liberation of Central Greece from the Ottomans. In 1960 the line from Larissa to Volos was converted to standard gauge and connected at Larissa with the mainline from Athens to Thessaloniki, allowing OSE to run through services to Volos from Athens and Thessaloniki. In 1955 Thessaly Railways was absorbed into Hellenic State Railways (SEK). In 1960 the line from Larissa to Volos was converted to standard gauge and connected though Larissa to the mainline from Athens to Thessaloniki, allowing OSE to run through services to Volos from Athens and Thessaloniki. In 1970 OSE became the legal successor to the SEK, taking over responsibilities for most of Greece's rail infrastructure.

In 2001 the infrastructure element of OSE was created, known as GAIAOSE; it would henceforth be responsible for the maintenance of stations, bridges and other elements of the network, as well as the leasing and the sale of railway assists. In 2005, TrainOSE was created as a brand within OSE to concentrate on rail services and passenger interface.

In 2009, with the Greek debt crisis unfolding OSE's Management was forced to reduce services across the network. Timetables were cut back, and routes closed as the government-run entity attempted to reduce overheads. In 2017 OSE's passenger transport sector was privatised as TrainOSE, currently a wholly-owned subsidiary of Ferrovie dello Stato Italiane infrastructure, including stations, remained under the control of OSE.

In May 2022, INTRAKAT was given the go-ahead for the €82.890.000 electrification and signalling upgrades of the Larissa–Volos line, due for completion in 2025. In July 2022, the station began being served by Hellenic Train, the rebranded TranOSE

Facilities
The station is little more than a halt, with only a small brick-built building on a raised platform, however no real disabled access.

Services
The station is served by fourteen local trains between Larissa and Volos.

References

Transport in Magnesia (regional unit)
Railway stations in Thessaly
Railway stations opened in 1884
Buildings and structures in Magnesia (regional unit)
Thessaly Railways